Pilar Barril (10 October 1931 – 30 September 2011) was a Spanish tennis player who was active during the 1950s and early 1960s. She and María Josefa de Riba were the first Spanish women to play international tennis tournaments after World War II.

Career
She was the first Spanish woman to reach the quarterfinals of the French Open since Lilí de Álvarez. She was also a semifinalist in the 1956 mixed doubles. She appeared regularly at the French Open during the 1950s and 1960s. No other Spanish player reached a quarterfinal at a Grand Slam until Arantxa Sánchez Vicario in 1987.

Career finals

Singles (5–7)

Doubles (2–5)

Mixed doubles (1–2)

Grand Slam singles tournament timeline

References

Spanish female tennis players
Sportswomen from Catalonia
Tennis players from Barcelona
1931 births
2011 deaths